The 1988–89 BCAFL was the fourth full season of the British Collegiate American Football League, organised by the British Students American Football Association.

Changes from previous season
BCAFL stayed at 11 teams

Division changes
There were no changes to the divisional setup

Team changes
 Loughborough University joined the Southern Conference, playing as the Aces
 Manchester MPs withdrew after three seasons

Regular season

Scottish Conference

Northern Conference

Southern Conference

Playoffs

References

External links
 Official BUAFL Website
 Official BAFA Website

1988-89
1989 in British sport
1988 in British sport
1989 in American football
1988 in American football